The Abra River, also called Lagben River, is the seventh largest river system in the Philippines in terms of watershed size.

Geography
The Abra originates in the southern section of Mount Data. It descends westward to Cervantes, Ilocos Sur, and flows into Abra. At a point near the municipality of Dolores, it is joined by the Tineg River, which originates in the uplands of Abra.

Crossings 
This is listed from mouth to source.

 Quirino Bridge (Santa–Bantay boundary, Ilocos Sur)
 Old Quirino (Banaoang) Bridge (Santa–Bantay boundary, Ilocos Sur)
 Calaba Bridge (Ilocos Norte–Abra Road, Bangued)
 Don Mariano Marcos Bridge (Abra–Kalinga Road, Tayum–Dolores boundary)
 Sto. Tomas Bridge (Manabo, Abra)
 Aluling Bridge (Tagudin–Cervantes–Sabangan Road (Cervantes)
 Cervantes–Mankayan–Abatan Road (Cervantes, Ilocos Sur)

References

External links

Rivers of the Philippines
Landforms of Abra (province)
Landforms of Ilocos Sur